Chariesthes nigropunctata is a species of beetle in the family Cerambycidae. It was described by Stephan von Breuning in 1934. It is known from the Democratic Republic of the Congo and South Africa.

References

Chariesthes
Beetles described in 1934